Oymadal is a village in the Mazgirt District, Tunceli Province, Turkey. The village is populated by Kurds of the Hormek and Kurêşan tribes and had a population of 36 in 2021.

The hamlets of Dibekli, Şenyurt and Topan are attached to the village.

References 

Villages in Mazgirt District
Kurdish settlements in Tunceli Province